The 137th Street–City College station is a local station on the IRT Broadway–Seventh Avenue Line of the New York City Subway. Located at the intersection of 137th Street and Broadway in Hamilton Heights, Manhattan, it is served by the 1 train at all times. The station serves the nearby City College of New York and Riverbank State Park.

The 137th Street station was constructed for the Interborough Rapid Transit Company (IRT) as part of the city's first subway line, which was approved in 1900. Construction of the line segment that includes 137th Street began on May 14 of the same year. The station opened on October 27, 1904, as one of the original 28 stations of the New York City Subway. The station's platforms were lengthened in 1948, and the station was renovated in the late 20th century.

The 137th Street station contains two side platforms and three tracks; the center track is not used in regular service. The station was built with tile and mosaic decorations. The platforms contain exits to Broadway's intersection with 137th Street and are not connected to each other within fare control.

History

Construction and opening 

Planning for a subway line in New York City dates to 1864. However, development of what would become the city's first subway line did not start until 1894, when the New York State Legislature authorized the Rapid Transit Act. The subway plans were drawn up by a team of engineers led by William Barclay Parsons, chief engineer of the Rapid Transit Commission. It called for a subway line from New York City Hall in lower Manhattan to the Upper West Side, where two branches would lead north into the Bronx. A plan was formally adopted in 1897, and all legal conflicts concerning the route alignment were resolved near the end of 1899.

The Rapid Transit Construction Company, organized by John B. McDonald and funded by August Belmont Jr., signed the initial Contract 1 with the Rapid Transit Commission in February 1900, under which it would construct the subway and maintain a 50-year operating lease from the opening of the line. In 1901, the firm of Heins & LaFarge was hired to design the underground stations. Belmont incorporated the Interborough Rapid Transit Company (IRT) in April 1902 to operate the subway.

The 137th Street station was constructed as part of the IRT's West Side Line (now the Broadway–Seventh Avenue Line) from 133rd Street to a point 100 feet (30 m) north of 182nd Street. Work on this section was conducted by L. B. McCabe & Brother, who started building the tunnel segment on May 14, 1900. The section of the West Side Line around this station was originally planned as a two-track line, but in early 1901, was changed to a three-track structure to permit train storage in the center track. A third track was added directly north of 96th Street, immediately east of the originally planned two tracks. By late 1903, the subway was nearly complete, but the IRT Powerhouse and the system's electrical substations were still under construction, delaying the system's opening.

The 137th Street station opened on October 27, 1904, as one of the original 28 stations of the New York City Subway from City Hall to 145th Street on the West Side Branch. The opening of the first subway line helped contribute to the development of Morningside Heights and Harlem.

Service changes and station renovations 
After the first subway line was completed in 1908, the station was served by West Side local and express trains. Express trains began at South Ferry in Manhattan or Atlantic Avenue in Brooklyn, and ended at 242nd Street in the Bronx. Local trains ran from City Hall to 242nd Street during rush hours, continuing south from City Hall to South Ferry at other times. In 1918, the Broadway–Seventh Avenue Line opened south of Times Square–42nd Street, thereby dividing the original line into an "H"-shaped system. The original subway north of Times Square thus became part of the Broadway–Seventh Avenue Line. Local trains were sent to South Ferry, while express trains used the new Clark Street Tunnel to Brooklyn.

To address overcrowding, in 1909, the New York Public Service Commission proposed lengthening platforms at stations along the original IRT subway. As part of a modification to the IRT's construction contracts, made on January 18, 1910, the company was to lengthen station platforms to accommodate ten-car express and six-car local trains. In addition to $1.5 million (equivalent to $ million in ) spent on platform lengthening, $500,000 was spent on building additional entrances and exits. It was anticipated that these improvements would increase capacity by 25 percent. The northbound platform at the 137th Street station was extended  to the south, while the southbound platform was not lengthened. Six-car local trains began operating in October 1910, and ten-car express trains began running on the West Side Line on January 24, 1911. Subsequently, the station could accommodate six-car local trains, but ten-car trains could not open some of their doors.

The city government took over the IRT's operations on June 12, 1940. A contract for the platform extensions at 137th Street and eight other stations on the line was awarded to Spencer, White & Prentis Inc. in October 1946. The platform extensions at these stations were opened in stages. On April 6, 1948, the platform extension at 137th Street opened. Simultaneously, the IRT routes were given numbered designations with the introduction of "R-type" rolling stock, which contained rollsigns with numbered designations for each service. The route to 242nd Street became known as the 1. In 1959, all 1 trains became local.

In 1981, the Metropolitan Transportation Authority listed the station among the 69 most deteriorated stations in the subway system. As a result, one of future U.S. president Barack Obama's first community organizing efforts after graduating from Columbia University was in conjunction with drawing attention to the poor condition of the station. In 1984 or 1985, Obama, who was working for the New York Public Interest Research Group, was among the leaders of May Day efforts to bring attention to the subway system, particularly the station serving CCNY. Obama traveled to stations to get people to sign letters addressed to local officials and the MTA. Obama was photographed holding a sign saying "May-Day! May-Day!! Sinking Subway System!"

In April 1988, the New York City Transit Authority (NYCTA) unveiled plans to speed up service on the Broadway–Seventh Avenue Line through the implementation of a skip-stop service: the 9 train. When skip-stop service started in 1989, it was only implemented north of 137th Street–City College on weekdays, and it was the northernmost local stop served by both the 1 and the 9. Skip-stop service ended on May 27, 2005, as a result of a decrease in the number of riders who benefited.

On January 2, 2007, film student Cameron Hollopeter suffered a seizure in the station and fell off the platform onto the tracks. Wesley Autrey saved his life as a train was approaching. Autrey was given numerous awards and prizes, and his two daughters were given a scholarship.

In 2019, as part of an initiative to increase the accessibility of the New York City Subway system, the MTA announced that it would install elevators at the 137th Street–City College station as part of the MTA's 2020–2024 Capital Program. In December 2022, the MTA announced that it would award a $146 million contract for the installation of eight elevators across four stations, including 137th Street.

Station layout 

This station was part of the original subway, and has two side platforms and three tracks, the center one being an unused express track. The platform extensions are at the southern ends of the original platforms.

Design
As with other stations built as part of the original IRT, the station was constructed using a cut-and-cover method. The tunnel is covered by a "U"-shaped trough that contains utility pipes and wires. Each platform consists of  concrete slabs, beneath which are drainage basins. The original platforms contained circular, cast-iron Doric-style columns spaced every , while the platform extensions contained I-beam columns. Additional columns between the tracks, spaced every , support the jack-arched concrete station roofs. There is a  gap between the trough wall and the platform walls, which are made of -thick brick covered over by a tiled finish. The columns have been overlaid with heavy brick blocks.

The decorative scheme consists of silver and blue tile tablets (which may not have been original to the station design); white tile bands; a buff terracotta cornice; and green terracotta plaques. The mosaic tiles at all original IRT stations were manufactured by the American Encaustic Tile Company, which subcontracted the installations at each station. The decorative work was performed by tile contractor Manhattan Glass Tile Company and terracotta contractor Atlantic Terra Cotta Company. The mosaics are in pink and black. The ceramic cartouche is also in pink and shows a three-faced figure. The three faces represent "Respice", "Adspice", and "Prospice", and are an emblem of the nearby City College.

Track layout
In the past, 137th Street was sometimes used as a terminal station. There are switches north of the station that allow northbound trains to enter the underground 137th Street Yard, then return to the other side of the station for the next trip south. The center express track that passes through the station is currently unused in revenue service.

Just south of the station, the tracks emerge onto the Manhattan Valley Viaduct. The line is elevated at 125th Street, and then underground once again at 116th Street–Columbia University, allowing trains to maintain a relatively level grade while passing through highly uneven terrain.

Exits

Both platforms have same-level fare control containing a bank of turnstiles and staircases to the street. The northbound platform has two staircases on the east side of Broadway at 137th Street, and the southbound platform has a token booth and two staircases, one to each western corner of Broadway and 137th Street. There are no crossovers or crossunders to allow transfers between directions.

In popular culture
The station was often shown on the TV drama New Amsterdam, though the inside shots were taken at the Grand Central station of the 42nd Street Shuttle.

References

Further reading

External links 

 
 nycsubway.org – Fossils Artwork by Steve Wood (1988)
 Station Reporter – 1 Train
 Forgotten NY – Original 28 – NYC's First 28 Subway Stations
 The Subway Nut – 137th Street–City College Pictures 
 MTA's Arts For Transit – 137th Street–City College (IRT Broadway–Seventh Avenue Line)
 137th Street entrance from Google Maps Street View
 Platforms from Google Maps Street View

IRT Broadway–Seventh Avenue Line stations
Broadway (Manhattan)
New York City Subway stations in Manhattan
Railway stations in the United States opened in 1904
Hamilton Heights, Manhattan
1904 establishments in New York City